The National Commission on Terrorist Attacks Upon the United States, also known as the 9/11 Commission, was set up on November 27, 2002, "to prepare a full and complete account of the circumstances surrounding the September 11 attacks", including preparedness for and the immediate response to the attacks. The commission was also mandated to provide recommendations designed to guard against future attacks.

Chaired by former New Jersey Governor Thomas Kean, the commission consisted of five Democrats and five Republicans. The commission was created by Congressional legislation, with the bill signed into law by President George W. Bush.

The commission's final report was lengthy and based on extensive interviews and testimony. Its primary conclusion was that the failures of the U.S. Central Intelligence Agency (CIA) and Federal Bureau of Investigation (FBI) permitted the terrorist attacks to occur and that if these agencies had acted more wisely and more aggressively, the attacks could potentially have been prevented.

After the publication of its final report, the commission closed on August 21, 2004. The commission's website was shut down, but has been archived.

History
The National Commission on Terrorist Attacks Upon the United States was established on November 27, 2002, by President George W. Bush and the United States Congress, with former Secretary of State Henry Kissinger initially appointed to head the commission. However, Kissinger resigned only weeks after being appointed, to avoid conflicts of interest. Former U.S. Senator George Mitchell was originally appointed as the vice chairman, but he stepped down on December 10, 2002, not wanting to sever ties to his law firm. On December 15, 2002, Bush appointed former New Jersey Governor Tom Kean to head the commission.

By the spring of 2003, the commission was off to a slow start, needing additional funding to help it meet its target day for the final report, of May 27, 2004. In late March, the Bush administration agreed to provide an additional $9 million for the commission, though this was $2 million short of what the commission requested. The first hearings were held from March 31 to April 1, 2003, in New York City.

Members

 Thomas Kean (Chairman) – Republican, former Governor of New Jersey
 Lee H. Hamilton (Vice Chairman) – Democrat, former U.S. Representative for the 9th congressional district of Indiana
 Richard Ben-Veniste – Democrat, attorney and former chief of the Watergate Task Force of the Watergate Special Prosecutor's Office
 Max Cleland – Democrat, former U.S. Senator from Georgia. Resigned in December 2003, stating that "the White House has played cover-up".
 Fred F. Fielding – Republican, attorney and former White House Counsel
 Jamie Gorelick – Democrat, former U.S. Deputy Attorney General in the Clinton Administration
 Slade Gorton – Republican, former U.S. Senator from Washington
 Bob Kerrey – Democrat, President of the New School University and former U.S. Senator from Nebraska. He replaced Max Cleland as a Democratic Commissioner, after Cleland's resignation.
 John F. Lehman – Republican, former Secretary of the Navy
 Timothy J. Roemer – Democrat, former U.S. Representative for the 3rd congressional district of Indiana
 James R. Thompson – Republican, former Governor of Illinois

The members of the commission's staff included:
 Philip D. Zelikow – Executive Director/Chair 
 Christopher Kojm – Deputy Executive Director
 Daniel Marcus – General Counsel
 John J. Farmer – Senior Counsel
 Dieter Snell - Senior Counsel
 Janice Kephart – Counsel
 Alvin S. Felzenberg – Spokesman

Initially, former U.S. Secretary of State and National Security Advisor, Henry Kissinger, was appointed Chairman but resigned, citing conflicts of interest. Upon his appointment, Congress had insisted that Kissinger disclose the names of his clients at Kissinger Associates, a consulting firm he runs in New York. The firm has long been discreet about its clientele, and Kissinger refused to comply with Congress' insistence.

Officials called to testify
Then government officials who were called to testify before the commission included:
 George W. Bush – President; testimony not under oath. The session was not officially transcribed because the White House considered it a "private meeting" in which highly classified information would be discussed. Asked to limit the length of testimony to one hour (However, the meeting lasted for three hours and ten minutes). Testimony took place in the Oval Office. Initially, Bush insisted that he testify only to the Chairman and Vice Chairman of the commission, but later agreed to testify before the full panel.
 Dick Cheney – Vice President; testimony not under oath. The session was not officially transcribed because the White House considered it a "private meeting" in which highly classified information would be discussed. Testimony took place in the Oval Office.
 George John Tenet – Director of Central Intelligence Agency
 Colin Powell – Secretary of State
 Donald H. Rumsfeld – Secretary of Defense
 Condoleezza Rice – National Security Advisor
 Richard Armitage – Deputy Secretary of State
 Paul Wolfowitz – Deputy Secretary of Defense
 Tom Ridge – Secretary of Homeland Security and former Governor of Pennsylvania
 John Ashcroft – Attorney General

Past government officials who were called to testify before the commission included:
 Bill Clinton – former president; testified in private separately from Al Gore. Testimony was recorded and not limited in time.
 Al Gore – former vice president; testified in private separately from Bill Clinton. Testimony was recorded and not limited in time.
 Madeleine Albright – former Secretary of State
 William Cohen – former Secretary of Defense
 Sandy Berger – former National Security Advisor
 Richard A. Clarke – former chief counter-terrorism adviser on the National Security Council in the George W. Bush and Bill Clinton administrations
 Rudy Giuliani – former Mayor of New York City
 Janet Reno – former Attorney General
 Sibel Edmonds – former FBI translator

President George W. Bush, Vice President Dick Cheney, former President Bill Clinton, and former Vice President Al Gore all gave private testimony. President Bush and Vice President Cheney insisted on testifying together and not under oath, while Clinton and Gore met with the panel separately. As National Security Advisor, Condoleezza Rice claimed that she was not required to testify under oath because the position of National Security Advisor is an advisory role, independent of authority over a bureaucracy and does not require confirmation by the Senate. Legal scholars disagree on the legitimacy of her claim. Eventually, Rice testified publicly and under oath.

Report

The commission issued its final report on July 22, 2004. After releasing the report, Commission Chair Thomas Kean declared that both Presidents Bill Clinton and George W. Bush were "not well served" by the FBI and CIA. The commission interviewed over 1,200 people in 10 countries and reviewed over two and a half million pages of documents, including some closely guarded classified national security documents. Before it was released by the commission, the final public report was screened for any potentially classified information and edited as necessary.

Additionally, the commission has released several supplemental reports on the terrorists' financing, travel, and other matters.

Criticism

The commission was criticized for alleged conflicts of interest on the part of commissioners and staff (e.g., Philip D. Zelikow, 9/11 Commission Executive Director/Chair in 1995 co-authored a book with Condoleezza Rice). Further, the commission's report has been the subject of criticism by both commissioners themselves and by others.

NORAD falsehoods
John Farmer, Jr., senior counsel to the Commission stated that the Commission "discovered that...what government and military officials had told Congress, the Commission, the media, and the public about who knew what when — was almost entirely, and inexplicably, untrue." Farmer continues: "At some level of the government, at some point in time … there was a decision not to tell the truth about what happened...The [NORAD] tapes told a radically different story from what had been told to us and the public." Thomas Kean, the head of the 9/11 Commission, concurred: "We to this day don’t know why NORAD told us what they told us, it was just so far from the truth."

CIA withheld information about its knowledge of hijackers
Director of U.S. Central Intelligence Agency (CIA) George Tenet misled the Commission and was "obviously not forthcoming" in his testimony to the Commission, according to Commission Co-chair Thomas Kean. An FBI agent named Doug Miller had been working inside Alec Station, also known as Bin Laden Issue Station, a unit of the CIA dedicated to tracking the activities of Osama bin Laden and his associates. By Spring 2000, Alec Station learned that Khalid al-Mihdhar, a Saudi national who was known at that time to be an al-Qaeda member, and Nawaf Al Hazmi, another Saudi who at that time was a suspected al-Qaeda operative, had entered the U.S. and were living under their own names in Southern California. FBI agent Miller wanted to inform the FBI of their entry and presence in the U.S. but the CIA blocked Miller's efforts to do so. Miller's contemporaneous draft cable to the FBI reporting on this, which the CIA prevented Miller from sending at the time, was found much later. Khalid al Mihdhar and Nawaf al Hazmi were 9/11 hijackers of American Airlines Flight 77. The CIA then failed to reveal to the Commission that over a year before 9/11 it had been tracking the two hijackers' entry into and whereabouts inside the United States. Co-chair Kean believes the CIA's failure to be forthcoming with this information to the Commission was deliberate, not a mistake, saying: "Oh, it wasn't careless oversight. It was purposeful. No question about that in my mind ... In the DNA of these organizations was secrecy."

Aftermath
Months after the commission had officially issued its report and ceased its functions, Chairman Kean and other commissioners toured the country to draw attention to the recommendations of the commission for reducing the terror risk, claiming that some of their recommendations were being ignored. Co-chairs Kean and Hamilton wrote a book about the constraints they faced as commissioners titled Without Precedent: The Inside Story of the 9/11 Commission.

The book was released on August 15, 2006 and chronicles the work of Kean (Commission Chairman) and Hamilton (Commission Vice-Chairman) of the 9/11 Commission. In the book, Kean and Hamilton charge that the 9/11 Commission was "set up to fail," and write that the commission was so frustrated with repeated misstatements by officials from The Pentagon and the Federal Aviation Administration during the investigation that it considered a separate investigation into possible obstruction of justice by Pentagon and FAA officials.

References

Further reading
 Without Precedent: The Inside Story of the 9/11 Commission, by Thomas H Kean and Lee H. Hamilton (Random House, August 2006) 
 The Commission: The Uncensored History of the 9/11 Investigation, by Philip Shenon (the Twelve - Jan. 2008), 
 The Next Ten Years of Post-9/11 Security Efforts, Q&A with 9/11 Commissioner Slade Gorton (July 2011)

External links

 
 The Complete 9/11 Commission Report (7 MB PDF)
 Kindle-formatted version of the Complete 9/11 Commission Report
 9/11 Commission staff biographies
 9/11 Public Discourse Project (Set up by Commission members following completion of report)
 The 9-11 Commission: An Audio Chronicle - NPR
 Congressional Research Service, 9/11 Commission Recommendations: Implementation Status, Dec. 2006
 Stonewalled by the C.I.A. Op-Ed piece written by Thomas Kean and Lee H. Hamilton in the January 2, 2008 edition of The New York Times
 9/11 Chair: Attack Was Preventable - from CBS
 The Shea Memorandum to the 9-11 Commission
 Photos of 9/11 Commission Public Hearings 7 to 12
 

 
2002 establishments in the United States
George W. Bush administration controversies
Public inquiries in the United States
United States documents
United States national commissions
Publications of the United States government
2004 disestablishments in the United States